Trendsetter may refer to:

trendsetting

Music
Trendsetter (Coi Leray album), 2022
Trendsetter (Fler album), 2006 
"Trendsetter", hit single by Morten Abel
"Trendsetter", single from Einár discography 2021
"Trendsetter", song by punk rock band Tiny Masters of Today from Bang Bang Boom Cake

Other
Trendsetter Approval proofer made by Kodak

See also
DJ Trendsetter (b.1987), also known by his stage name Trendsetter
Trendsetters Limited  pop band, active in the 1960s. The group is best known for featuring future King Crimson members Michael 
Trendsetter Media and Marketing music video promotion and production with offices in both New Jersey and Los Angeles
Style Savvy: Trendsetters, known as Nintendo presents: New Style Boutique in the PAL region